San Bernardino alle Ossa is a church in Milan, northern Italy, best known for its ossuary, a small side chapel decorated with numerous human skulls and bones.

In 1210, when an adjacent cemetery ran out of space, a room was built to hold bones. A church was attached in 1269. Renovated in 1679, it was destroyed by a fire in 1712. A new bigger church was then attached to the older one and dedicated to Saint Bernardino of Siena.

History
The church's origins date to 1145, when a hospital and a cemetery were built in front of the basilica of Santo Stefano Maggiore. In 1210 a chamber was built to house bones from the cemetery, next to which a church was built in 1269. It was restored for the first time in 1679 by Giovanni Andrea Biffi, who modified the façade and decorated the walls of the ossuary with human skulls and tibiae.

The church was destroyed in 1712; it was replaced by a new edifice designed by Carlo Giuseppe Merlo, featuring a central plan and larger size reflecting the increasing popularity of the ossuary. The new church, connected to the former one by an ambulatory, was dedicated to St. Bernardino of Siena.

The façade was completed in 1776.

Overview
The interior has an octagonal plan, with Baroque-style decorations. The several chapels have paintings from the 16th-18th centuries.

The ossuary's vault was frescoed in 1695 by Sebastiano Ricci with a Triumph of Souls and Flying Angels, while in the pendentives are portrayed the Holy Virgin, St. Ambrose, St. Sebastian and St. Bernardino of Siena. Niches and doors are decorated with bones, in Roccoco style.

In 1738 King John V of Portugal was so struck by the chapel, that had a very similar one built at Évora, near Lisbon.

Gallery

Notes

Roman Catholic churches completed in 1776
18th-century Roman Catholic church buildings in Italy
Bernardino alle Ossa
Ossuaries
Mannerist architecture in Italy
Tourist attractions in Milan